The North Avenue Rural Historic District is a rural historic district in northern Mendon, Massachusetts. The area has been a rural agricultural area since the early days of Mendon's history in the 17th century. The present landscape retains boundaries and land-use patterns that were established in the 18th and 19th centuries, although some features (generally within individual farms) have been lost or obscured to accommodate modern farming practices. The architecture of the area is predominantly 19th century; the oldest building in the district appears to be the Federal style house of the Seth Davenport Farm at 133 North Avenue, built c. 1780.

The district was added to the National Register of Historic Places in 2003.

See also
National Register of Historic Places listings in Worcester County, Massachusetts

References

Mendon, Massachusetts
Historic districts in Worcester County, Massachusetts
National Register of Historic Places in Worcester County, Massachusetts
Historic districts on the National Register of Historic Places in Massachusetts